Krasnaya Zarya is a rural locality (a khutor) in Panfilovskoye Rural Settlement, Novoanninsky District, Volgograd Oblast, Russia. The population was 296 as of 2010. There are 6 streets.

Geography 
Krasnaya Zarya is located 240 km from Volgograd, 28 km southeast of Novoanninsky (the district's administrative centre) by road. Panfilovo is the nearest rural locality.

References 

Rural localities in Novoanninsky District